Thillo may refer to:

 Saint Thillo (c. 608–702), French priest, abbot and hermit
 Christian Van Thillo (born 1962), Belgian businessman
 Jos Van Thillo (born 1942), Belgian coxswain